Chobyong Sports Club (Hancha:哨兵體育團) is an association football club from North Korea.

Chobyong are believed to be an academy team, bringing through and selling many players to clubs in North Korea and Europe, such as Han Kwang-song and Choe Song-hyok.

It is unknown what league Chobyong play in, but it is not the DPR Korea League, which they were promoted to, and presumably relegated from in 2015.

References 

Football clubs in North Korea